Rajiv Gandhi was sworn in as Prime Minister of India on 31 October 1984.

Rajiv Gandhi's cabinet included 7 Agriculturists, 15 Lawyers, 4 Journalists and 3 former Princely state rulers.

Cabinet
Key
  Died in office
  Resigned

|}

Ministers of State

Parliamentary Secretary (Prime Minister's Office)
 Oscar Fernandes

References

Indian union ministries
Rajiv Gandhi administration
1984 establishments in India
1989 disestablishments in India
Cabinets established in 1984
Cabinets disestablished in 1989